Timothy John Bevan,  (born 20 December 1957) is a New Zealand-British film producer, the co-chairman (with Eric Fellner) of the production company Working Title Films.

Bevan and Fellner are the most successful British producers of their era, having produced several critically and commercially successful films including Four Weddings and a Funeral (1994), Elizabeth (1998), Notting Hill (1999), Billy Elliot (2000), Bridget Jones's Diary (2001), Atonement (2007),  Frost/Nixon (2008), Tinker Tailor Soldier Spy (2011), The Theory of Everything (2014), and Darkest Hour (2017). They are also notable for their long-time collaboration with American filmmakers the Coen brothers, having produced Barton Fink (1991), Fargo (1996),  The Hudsucker Proxy (1994), The Big Lebowski (1998), and O Brother, Where Art Thou? among others. As of 2017, films by Working Title Films have won 12 Academy Awards and 39 British Academy Film Awards.

Bevan was appointed a Commander of the Order of the British Empire (CBE) in the 2005 Birthday Honours for services to the British film industry.

Early life and education
Bevan was born in 1957 in Queenstown, New Zealand. From 1969—1974, he was educated at Sidcot School, a Quaker boarding independent school in the Mendip Hills, near the village of Winscombe in North Somerset, in South West England. He then attended Cheltenham College, a boarding independent school in the spa town of Cheltenham in Gloucestershire, in the West of England.

Life and career
Bevan co-founded Working Title Films in London with Sarah Radclyffe and Graham Bradstreet in the 1980s. (Eric Fellner now partners Tim Bevan at Working Title Films). Among Bevan's more than 40 films as producer or executive producer are Moonlight and Valentino, Fargo, O Brother, Where Art Thou?, The Guru, Captain Corelli's Mandolin, Love Actually, Notting Hill, Elizabeth, Bridget Jones's Diary, Atonement, and Frost/Nixon. Through 2017, the films he has co-produced have grossed a total of almost $7 billion worldwide.

Working Title Films signed a deal with Universal Studios in 1999 for a reported US$600 million, which gave Bevan and Fellner the power to commission projects with a budget of up to $35 million without having to consult their paymasters.

Bevan is a co-producer of the West End musical Billy Elliot.

Personal life
Bevan is divorced from English actress Joely Richardson; the two have a daughter, Daisy, born in 1992. Bevan is now married to Amy Gadney, and they have a daughter Nell, born 2001, and a son Jago, born 2003.

Filmography

Film

Television
Executive producer

Awards and honours
2005: Commander of the Order of the British Empire (CBE)
2013 received the degree of Doctor honoris causa from The University of York
2018: Cinematic Production Award of the Royal Photographic Society

References

External links

1957 births
Living people
British film producers
British television producers
People from Queenstown, New Zealand
People educated at Cheltenham College
People educated at Sidcot School
Filmmakers who won the Best Film BAFTA Award
Golden Globe Award-winning producers
Commanders of the Order of the British Empire
Tony Award winners
Working Title Films
New Zealand emigrants to the United Kingdom